A cosmopolitan, or, informally, a cosmo, is a cocktail made with vodka, Cointreau, cranberry juice, and freshly squeezed or sweetened lime juice.

History

The International Bartenders Association recipe is based on vodka citron, lemon-flavored vodka. The cosmopolitan is a relative of cranberry coolers like the Cape Codder. Though often presented far differently, the cosmopolitan also bears a likeness in composition to the kamikaze cocktail.

The origin of the cosmopolitan is disputed.

The 1930s 

While the cocktail is widely perceived to be a more modern creation, there is a recipe for a Cosmopolitan Daisy which appears in Pioneers of Mixing at Elite Bars 1903–1933, published in 1934.

Jigger of Gordon's Gin ( Beefeater)
2 dash Cointreau ( Cointreau)
Juice of 1 Lemon ( Lemon Juice)
1 tsp [.5 cl] Raspberry Syrup (homemade)

Shake with ice and strain into a cocktail glass.

Made with ingredients that would have been readily available during the period, this identically named cocktail aims for the same effect. If this drink is in fact the source of the modern cosmopolitan, then it would be an adaption of a Daisy rather than a Kamikaze.

Provincetown
One version of the creation of this popular drink credits the accomplishment to the gay community in Provincetown, Massachusetts.

Neal Murray
Bartender Neal Murray says he created the cosmopolitan in 1975 at the Cork & Cleaver steak house in Minneapolis. According to Murray, he added a splash of cranberry juice to a Kamikaze and the first taster declared, "How cosmopolitan."  Murray's Cosmopolitan used 1.5 oz Gordon's vodka, .75 oz Rose's Lime, .75 oz Leroux triple sec, and .5 oz cranberry juice.

John Caine 
John Caine is the owner of several popular bars in San Francisco and a cosmopolitan expert. He partially credits the upsurge in cocktails during the 1970s to the Cosmo being served at fern bars. Caine is credited with bringing the Cosmo west from Cleveland.

Cheryl Cook 
There are a number of other claims made as to the origin of the cosmopolitan. Cocktail historian Gary Regan credits bartender Cheryl Cook of the Strand Restaurant in South Beach, Florida with the original creation. In a letter to Regan, Cook related the story of how she created the drink in 1985 or 1986:

Cook's original recipes called for "Absolut Citron, a splash of Triple sec, a drop of Rose's lime and just enough cranberry to make it oh so pretty in pink."  Although Absolut Citron was not introduced anywhere officially until 1988, it was test marketed in Miami.

Melissa Huffsmith-Roth
Notable bartender Gaz Regan says that the internationally recognized version of the cocktail was created by Toby Cecchini & Melissa Huffsmith-Roth in 1989 at the Odeon restaurant in Manhattan based on a poorly described version of Cheryl Cook's creation. Huffsmith-Roth's Cosmopolitan includes 2 oz Absolut Citron vodka, 1 oz Cointreau, 1 oz lime juice, and .5 oz cranberry juice.

New York City
According to Sally Ann Berk and Bob Sennett, the cosmopolitan appears in literature as early as 1993 and derives from New York City. However, a bartender named Patrick "Paddy" Mitten is also credited with bringing the drink to New York City from San Francisco in October 1987.

Popularity
The cosmopolitan gained popularity in the 1990s. It was further popularized among young women by its frequent mention on the television program Sex and the City, where Sarah Jessica Parker's character, Carrie Bradshaw, commonly ordered the drink when out with her girlfriends. The film adaptation made a reference to its popularity when Miranda asks why they stopped drinking them, Carrie replies "because everyone else started."

Preparation and serving

The cosmopolitan is usually served in a large cocktail glass, also called a martini glass. For this reason, the drink is  sometimes mistakenly categorized as a type of martini.

The use of citrus flavored vodka as the basis for this cocktail appears to have been widely popularized in the mid 1990s by Dale DeGroff and is used in the IBA-approved recipe. However, many bartenders continue to use a standard unflavored vodka and this alternative would undoubtedly be historically consistent with any of the supposed predecessors of this drink that were popular in Ohio, Provincetown, or Minneapolis during the 1970s, or in San Francisco during the 1980s. A lemon twist is sometimes used to garnish.

Variations
 Another variation calls for stirring in a mixing glass, instead of shaking.
 An alternative ingredient in substitution for Cointreau is a variation of the French Martini.
 The Real Housewives of New Jersey star Kathy Wakile created a Red Velvet Cosmo, based on one of her favorite desserts, red velvet cake.
 For a virgin cosmopolitan replace the vodka and triple sec with orange juice and pink lemonade.
 For a constipolitan, use prune juice in place of cranberry juice.
 A CosNOpolitan, from Kimbal Musk's The Kitchen, has cranberry juice, lime, orange bitters and soda.

See also
 List of cocktails
 Martini

References

External links

Cocktails with triple sec or curaçao
Cocktails with vodka
Food and drink in the San Francisco Bay Area
Cocktails with cranberry juice